Susan Lendroth is a communications professional and a children's author.

Bibliography
 Old Manhattan Has Some Farms, Charlesbridge Publishing, to be released August, 2014
 Calico Dorsey: Mail Dog of the Mining Camps, Tricycle Press, an imprint of Random House, 2010.
 Maneki Neko: The Tale of the Beckoning Cat, Shen's Books, 2010.
 Ocean Wide, Ocean Deep, Tricycle Press, an imprint of Random House, 2008.
 Why Explore?, Tricycle Press, an imprint of Random House, 2005.

General references
Sacramento Bee, September 6, 2010, Calico Dorsey review 
BookDragon, Smithsonian Asian Pacific American Program, August 5, 2010, Maneki Neko review 
Rutgers University Project on Economics and Children, Ocean Wide, Ocean Deep review 
Cosmic Log, MSNBC.com, December 9, 2005, Why Explore? review

American children's writers
Year of birth missing (living people)
Living people
American women children's writers
21st-century American women